Jelena Rozga (born 23 August 1977) is a Croatian pop, folk, and electropop singer. Born and raised in Split, Croatia, Rozga was a ballet dancer as a child. She rose to fame in 1996, when she became the lead singer of Magazin, a pop band famous in Croatia. She served as the band's lead singer until 2006, releasing a total of five studio albums. During the ten years, the band released numerous commercially and critically successful singles including "Ginem", "Minut' srca tvog" and "Minus i plus" among others. 

In 2006, Rozga launched a solo career with the release of her debut studio album Oprosti Mala. The album was a major commercial and critical success that established her status as a solo artist. It peaked on top of the Croatian Albums Chart and produced several commercially successful singles, including "Gospe moja", "Oprosti mala", and "Ne zovi me Marija". Rozga's second studio album Bižuterija (2011) produced the eponymous number-one lead single as well as singles "Rodit ću ti 'ćer i sina" and "Ona ili ja". In support of the album, Rozga launched her first headlining tour, The Bižuterija Tour (2010–2012). She became the first Croatian female artist ever to sell out a concert at the Spaladium Arena.

Moderna žena, the singer's third studio album, was released in 2016, and featured some of her most famous singles as a solo artist to date, including "Nirvana", "Kraljica", and "Tsunami". Moderna žena was Rozga's third studio album to top the Croatian Albums Chart and to receive a gold certification by the Croatian Phonographic Association. It further became the best-selling album of the year in Croatia. On 14 November 2022, Rozga released her first acoustic compilation album Minut Srca Mog. She will embark on the regional Minut Srca Mog Tour (2022-23) in its promotion.

In addition to her singing career, Rozga also shortly ventured in acting and voiceovers. She is considered to be one of the most famous singers in Croatia, having received gold certifications for three solo albums and having won numerous awards, including the Grand Prix award at the Split Festival. She has also enjoyed wider regional success and popularity in Serbia, Montenegro, North Macedonia, Bosnia and Herzegovina, and Slovenia.

Early life 

Jelena Rozga was born on 23 August 1977, to mother Marija Rozga, a taylor in the company Jugoplastika, and father Antonio Rozga in Split, a town in the region of Dalmatia, Croatia. Rozga has one older sister named Julija. Rozga was a hyperactive and energetic child who often danced and performed in her house. She insisted on becoming a ballet dancer and her parents sent her to ballet classes during the first grade of primary school when she was seven years old. She joined KUD Mozaik where she was under the guidance of Lepa Smoje, a famous Croatian choreographer. As a ballet dancer, she participated in various Yugoslav competitions. At the age of 13, Rozga was invited to participate in the opera house La Scala in Milan. Her parents, who could not afford moving abroad, could not let her participate. During her teenage years, Rozga first joined the high school in Split and after deciding to pursue her passion for dancing, she auditioned to join the ballet ensemble of the Croatian National Theatre in Zagreb. She was accepted by the commission which was amazed by her dancing talents. Together with the group, she started performing in various localized productions of the plays Swan Lake, Sleeping Beauty and The Nutcracker among others. Rozga later revealed that the ballet classes she did as a child "shaped me as a woman [...] it gave me order, dedication and discipline in life".

During an interview for the Croatian TV channel Croatian Music Channel, Rozga revealed that even as a ballet dancer in her childhood, she had a big passion for singing and her dream, if she were ever to venture in a music career, would be to join Croatian pop band Magazin, whose lead singer at that time, Ljiljana Nikolovska, served as a source of inspiration for her. Rozga was also an avid fan of the band, whose songs she knew by heart. In 1992, Rozga received an award at a singing competition where she performed the song "Uvenut će ružmarin" by Magazin. In 1994, she participated in another competition, Zvuci Jadrana, where she received the award Zlatna Gospa for best performance for her rendition of Magazin's "Ti si želja mog života".

Career

1996–2006: Magazin

When Rozga was at the age of 18, her mother who saw that Magazin's lead singer at that time, Danijela Martinović, was leaving the group, contacted group leader Tonči Huljić, informing him about her daughter's interest in auditioning for the group. Rozga's mother also gave Huljić a picture of her daughter and home cassettes with audio recordings of her home performances. Even before hearing her sing, Huljić decided to contract Rozga based on how "powerful" and unusual her surname sounded. He traveled to Split where Rozga auditioned for five minutes, performing "only a song and a half", including "Opusti se" and "Zlato ljubavi". Shortly after hearing her sing, Tonči Huljić worked on "Aha" together with his wife, Vjekoslava Huljić, which was the first song Rozga had ever recorded. Subsequently, Rozga stopped her ballet career and embarked on her musical career in the group Magazin. In 1996, she performed "Aha" on Dora, the Croatian song contest for Eurovision that year, where she finished second. For the performance of the song, she appeared dressed as a ballerina and performed a dance choreography. 

That same year, at the age of 18, she signed a deal with Tonika Records, thus succeeding Danijela Martinović as the lead singer of Magazin. The first song she recorded with the group was "Suze Biserne" which the band also performed at the 1996 . The song instantly became popular among fans of the group and at the 1996 Melodije hrvatskog Jadrana, it was recognized as the most performed song of the year. In 1996, Magazin released their first album together with Rozga, and their twelfth overall studio album titled Nebo boje moje ljubavi. The album was a big commercial success receiving a golden certification in Croatia. It produced several hit songs, including the widely famous singles "Suze Biserne", "Opijum" and "Minut' srca tvog" as well as "Nebo boje moje ljubavi" and "Samo navika". In 1997, Magazin competed at Dora with the song "Opijum", finishing seventh. Several months after, the band also participated at the Melodijama Hrvatskog Jadrana (MHJ) where they performed the song "Ime mi spominje". In 1998, the group's second studio album with Rozga, Da si ti ja was released; it was a commercial success in the region of former Yugoslavia, receiving a platinum certification in Croatia and Slovenia. The album produced several commercially successful singles, including "Gutljaj vina", "Ginem", "Na svijetu sve" and "Idi i ne budi ljude". The songs nevertheless were not well received by music critics due to their "easy" and simple lyrics. 

In 1999, Magazin performed at Dora with the song "Kasno je" and at the MHJ '99, they performed "Ako poludim". Minus i plus, the band's third album with Rozga, was released in 2000 and also included a streak of commercially successful singles such as the title song, "Je l' zbog nje", "Nemam snage da se pomirim" and "Ako poludim". The band performed "Hrvatska rapsodija" from the album at the 2000 Dora Festival and then "Nemam snage da se pomirim" at the Runjićev Festival. The fourth studio album S druge strane mjeseca saw the release of several singles including the eponymous song, "Ko me zove?" and "Ne vjerujem tebi, ne vjerujem sebi"; the last was performed at the MHJ '02. The band also performed for the first time at the 2002 festival Zlatne žice Slavonije with the song "Hajde, kaži kako". 

The last album Magazin released with Rozga was  Paa..? and it included the hit singles "Ne tiče me se", "Troši i uživaj", "Kad bi bio blizu", "Da li znaš da te ne volim" and "Slatko, ljuto, kiselo". In promotion of the album, the band performed "Kad bi bio blizu" at the 2003 Radijski festival and "Da li znaš da te ne volim" at the Split Festival. In 2004, the band won at the Split Music Festival with the song "Ne tiče me se" and performed at the Zlatne žice Slavonije festival with the song "Često". The band competed at the Dora 2005 with the Biblical-themed song "Nazaret" featuring Ervin, placing second. In 2006, Rozga left the group, after having been the lead singer for ten years. She continued collaborating with Tonči Huljić, the founder of the band.

2006–2009: Oprosti Mala
Rozga recorded and released her debut solo album Oprosti Mala in 2006; the album was a commercial success reaching the top of the Croatian Albums Chart. That same year, she performed the album's title song featuring Magazin at the 2006 Dora national festival which marked her debut solo performance. Oprosti Mala produced six singles including "Oprosti mala", "Ne zovi me Marija, "Ja znam dobro što mi je", "Sve se meni čini da", "Nemam" and "Gospe moja". In 2006, Rozga took part in the Dora national song festival with "Ne zovi me Marija" which finished 6th. Rozga performed "Gospe moja" at the 2007 Split Festival where the song also received the Grand Prix award.

During interviews, Rozga revealed that the transition from Magazin to a solo career was a challenging and difficult period that caused a lot of stress and health problems. She revealed that she was unaware of all the responsibilities and independent decisions a solo career would bring along and experienced disappointment when some of her initial concerts were attended by small audiences. Huljić also revealed that the initial period of transition involved searching for the sound the audience expected of Rozga and that it took almost four years before they could find her sound.

Rozga's career rapidly moved upwards, especially in 2008 when she received the Grand Prix at the Split Music Festival for having the most played song from the previous year's festival's edition for "Gospe moja". She then released single "Daj šta daš" which topped charts both in Croatia and other neighbouring countries. The song also won the Grand Prix in 2009 for being the most played song from last year's festival edition. Two other singles were released in 2008, including "Djevica" and "Ožiljak". In 2009, Rozga performed on Hrvatski Radijski Festival with "Svega ima, al' bi još" in the category of pop-folk music. Rozga performed at the 2009 Split Festival with "Rodit ću ti 'ćer i sina", and the year after, 2010, for the third time in a row, she won the Grand Prix for the most played song ("Rodit ću ti 'ćer i sina"). The end of the year saw the release of, "Nevjeran do groba", a duet with Miligram and "Ostavit ću svitlo", a duet with Klapa Iskon.

2009–2011: Bižuterija
In May 2010, she collaborated with Željko Samardžić on the song "Ima nade", and the accompanying music video was filmed in Split by Željko Petres. In 2010, after its debut at the Split Festival, "Bižuterija" became the most played song of the summer and a number-one single both in Croatia and in the whole Balkans. The song is considered a turning point in her career as it gained very high popularity. As of 2020, the audio and the official music video for the song have combined more than 35 million views on YouTube. In early 2011 Rozga released her second studio album Bižuterija which sold over 15,000 copies within a month of its release, thus earning a gold certification from the Croatian Phonographic Association. The album produced several hit singles, including the title song, "Karantena", "Ona ili ja" and "Rodit ću ti 'ćer i sina". To promote the album, Rozga embarked on The Bižuterija Tour in all major cities in Croatia, starting with a concert held in Zadar on 27 October 2011. Rozga became the first female artist that sold out all the tickets at the Spaladium Arena (with a capacity of around 12,000) in her hometown of Split on 11 February 2011. Several months later, she also had another sold-out concert in Zagreb at the Cibona hall.

That same year, Rozga won a Porin award (Croatia's version of the Grammys) in the category Hit of the Year with "Bižuterija" at the 18th ceremony. The award caused controversy as it won the most votes by the audience but many Croatian music artists and critics dismissed it. Later that spring, she collaborated with the rap group Connection on the song "Dalmatinka" which became a summer hit. In the summer of 2011, she performed "Razmažena" at the Split Festival and won another Grand Prix for getting the most votes from the audience. The music video for the song, directed by Gitak TV and released on 18 October, features Rozga dressed as a bride and eloping from her wedding after a short conversation with a priest; as of 2021, it has more than 16 million views on her official YouTube channel. By the end of 2011, she released her double-CD Best of compilation. The first disc of the album features the greatest hits of her solo career and the second disc, her greatest hits in the years with Magazin (1996–2006). In November, that same year Rozga had her first solo concert at the Sava Center in Belgrade and in December she embarked the Karlovačko live 2011. co-headlining tour with the band Bajaga i instruktori during which she visited all major cities in Croatia.

2012–2017: Moderna žena
On 3 March 2012, Rozga released "Zanemari" along with a music video directed by Darko Drinovac on 23 April 2012. At the 2012 Split Festival, she performed the song "Solo igračica" which got her the Srebrni galeb award i.e. second place by audience selection. Rozga simultaneously released her summer single "Dobitna kombinacija". After a couple of months, she filmed music videos for both singles in Sarajevo under the direction of GOTIVA Sarajevo. The music video, released on 27 September 2012, combined both songs into one, thus creating a short movie with an overarching theme. This made Rozga the first singer both in Croatia and neighboring countries to make such an attempt. On 26 March 2013, Rozga released the single "Nirvana" along with an accompanying music video that saw her perform a choreography backed by two male dancers. The song, which received a lot of media and press coverage, achieved huge success in all former Yugoslav countries. As of 2021, the music video for the song is the second most watched on Rozga's YouTube channel with 36.5 million views. That same summer, she released the song "Obožavam", and in November, 2013, the power ballad "Cirkus". The songs peaked at numbers 5 and 2 on the Croatian Singles Chart, respectively.

In the beginning of 2014, on 24 January, Rozga released the ballad "Prsti zapleteni" in collaboration with I. Brnas and Pero Kozomara featuring Klapa Rišpet. On 14 March 2014, Rozga released "Okus mentola" which became a hit single and its music video has over 25 million views on the singer's YouTube channel as of 2020. The same summer, she released the song "Život je čudo" written by the pair Huljić along with a music video filmed at the beach and directed by Darko Radusin. The song "Odo' ja" recorded for the soundtrack of the popular television show Kud puklo da puklo was released on 6 November 2014. On 9 December 2014, Rozga released "Tsunami", a single which became one of her biggest hits within the shortest amount of time. Within 24 hours of its release, the song was viewed more than 400,000 times on YouTube, becoming the most viewed video by the singer in a day. As of 2021, the song has over 47 million views on YouTube, making it Rozga's most watched video on the platform. 2015 saw the release of the singles "Kraljica" on 21 June and "Otrov" on 27 November. Following a short hiatus from new music, Rozga released the ballad "Udajem se" as a single on 16 February 2016. On 15 July 2016, the song "Nasljednik" was released as a summer single. This was followed by the release of the ballad "Pismo-Glava" on 8 December 2016 and the title song "Moderna žena" on 16 December 2016, along with accompanying music videos directed by Darko Drinovac and Dario Radusin, respectively.

Six years after the release of her previous album, on 16 December 2016, Rozga released her third studio album Moderna žena through Croatia Records. The album was released in a dual-disc format: the first disc contained 6 new songs and 5 previously released singles, and the second disk contained her older singles released in the period between 2011 and 2014. In the first week of its release, Moderna žena debuted atop the Croatian Albums Chart and it remained there for 11 consecutive weeks and 17 weeks in total after its release. Only 3 months after its release, the album received a gold certification and sold over 5,000 copies. The album became the best-selling record of the year in Croatia in 2017. It was nominated for the Best Pop Album at the 2017 Porin Awards held on 17 March 2017. On 16 December 2016, the song "Prava Koke" for the soundtrack of the musical Matilda was released through Dallas Records.

The song "Žileti", written by Saša Lazić and arranged by Aca Krsmanović was released as the third single from the album on 16 March 2017. The song received around 210,000 views in one day and more than 600,000 views in one week. On 11 April 2017, Rozga released the last single from the album, titled "Ne pijem, ne pušim" along with a music video directed by Dario Radusin and inspired by Robert Palmer's "Addicted to Love". That same summer saw the release of two new songs; the ballad "Rodjena sam", written by Robert Pilepić and arranged by Pero Kozomara in June and the turbo-folk infused "Svjetla neona" written by the Huljić pair, in July. On 13 November 2017, Rozga performed "Prsten na sto" at the Lisinski theater together with Montenegrin singer Sergej Ćetković.

2018-2020: New singles and performances
On 27 March 2018, following a tour in Australia, Rozga released a new single titled "Najbolji dan", written by Tonči and Vjekoslava Huljić along with a music video directed by Sandra Mihaljević. On 29 May 2018, Rozga appeared on Narodni radio where she performed at the Living Room Acoustic and gave an interview; her acoustic live medley of "Oprosti mala", "Opijum" and "S druge strane mjeseca" has been watched more than 18 million times as of 2022. On 20 July, the same year, Rozga released another single titled "Uzmem koliko mi daš" written by the pair Huljić, along with a music video directed by Dario Radusin filmed in Istria. 

In September, Rozga released another song, titled "Ostani" written by Serbian singer-songwriter Emina Jahović and produced by Macedonian producer Darko Dimitrov. The song and its accompanying music video received a lot of media attention due to a change in the singer's image and sound. Within the first 24 hours of its release, the song received 350,000 views, which is the second most watched music video by the singer within the first day after "Tsunami" which received 400,000 views in a day. On 29 January 2019, Rozga released a ballad titled "Moje Proljeće" written by Jahović and produced by Darko Dimitrov. She performed the song on the same day at the 2019 Music Awards Ceremony (MAC) show in Belgrade. A music video for the song, portraying an emotional Rozga singing the song and wandering in a snowy forest, directed by Dario Radusin, was released the same day. It garnered 2 million views on YouTube in a week and received widespread praise from her fanbase.

On 28 January 2020, Rozga released "Sveto Pismo" which she also performed at the 2020 MAC Awards Show. The song was written by Tonči and Vjekoslava Huljić and the production was arranged by Darko Dimitrov and Serbian singer Željko Joksimović. The following month, Rozga appeared on the Macedonian Golden Ladybug of Popularity awards show, where she received the award for Most Popular Regional Singer. She also performed "Sveto Pismo" and a medley of "Cirkus", "Ne pijem, ne pušim" and "Dani su bez broja" during the show. Starting on 12 April 2020 and concluding on 17 May 2020, during the COVID-19 pandemic, Rozga streamed seven weekly mini live concerts through Instagram Live and YouTube during which she performed acoustic covers of her songs from her living room.

2020-ongoing: new singles, Minut Srca Mog and tour
In late 2019, Rozga revealed that she was working on an acoustic album which will reportedly feature 17 acoustic reworks of her songs with Magazin. The inspiration for the album came after the popularity of her acoustic cover on narodni Radio's live event. The album was set for release some time in 2020 although due to the COVID-19 pandemic, Rozga revealed that its release will be postponed for 2021 since she scrapped the work initially done and started from scratch. On 12 November 2020, Rozga released a cover of the song "Kad nema ljubavi" by Croatian singer Ilan Kabiljo as part of the project New Sound of the 90s. She had performed the song as part of a medley with "Sveto pismo" and a cover of Oliver Dragojević's "Najlipše te jubi oni što te gubi" live in March earlier that year at the 2020 Golden Studio Awards. On 7 December 2020, Rozga appeared on Narodni radio's Christmas Living Room where she performed an acoustic cover of Petar Grašo's "Fritula". On 8 December 2020, Rozga appeared on the 9th gathering of the HEP Opskrba where she had an interview and performed acoustic versions of five songs. On 25 December, on Christmas, Rozga held an online live concert on Instagram accompanied by Milan Terze and Karlo Dotur on guitar.

Huljić planned and announced that a concept for a music video for the rework exists. On 5 June 2021, Rozga performed a medley of Nataša Bekvalac's songs and rearranged versions of "Cirkus" and "Minut' srca tvog" at the 2021 MAC Awards show. The summer of 2021 saw Rozga touring in various cities in Croatia, Serbia, North Macedonia and Slovenia. On 15 December 2021, "Ti i Ja", a collaboration between Rozga and Saša Matić included on the latter's studio album Dva života, was released along with an accompanying music video. On 18 January 2022, Rozga appeared on the Ami G show in Belgrade where she gave an interview, performed several of her hit songs and sang a duet of "Ti i Ja" with Matić. On 19 May, 2022, Rozga appeared at narodni Living Room acoustic where she performed the songs "Ne pijem, ne pušim", "Solo igračica" and a medley of "Nebo boje moje ljubavi", "Minut' srca tvog" and "Ginem". She also gave a short interview where she announced a concert at the Fusion World Music Festival on 19 July 2022 and one at the Zagreb Arena on 17 December 2022 which will serve as the first one that is part of her regional tour, titled the Minut Srca Mog Tour. The tour will visit other major cities in the region, such as Split, Belgrade, Skopje, Sarajevo and Ljubljana.

On 15 September 2022, Rozga confirmed that the title of the acoustic compilation album would be Minut Srca Mog in reference to her 1996 eponymous single. The first acoustic cover of the song, "Zar je ljubav spala na to" featuring Matija Cvek and produced by Srđan Sekulović – Skansi, was released on the same day along with a music video. The single was successful on the HR Top 40, the country's airplay chart, where it peaked at number four for the week ending 29 August 2022. The singer revealed during an interview that only the opening song with Cvek was rearranged musically, while the rest of the album songs were included in their original form, played and sung live with the addition of instruments such as strings, French harmonicas and Mediterranean mandolins. On 21 October 2022, "Grizem", originally from Rozga's second studio album Bižuterija (2011), was released as the second single off the album along with a visuals video directed by Dario Radusin. On 3 November during an interview with Dalmacija News, Rozga presented her new single titled "Samo se ljubit' isplati" and announced a music video. The song was intended to remind listeners to her musical style during the time she served as the lead singer of Magazin. On 11 November, an accompanying music video for the song premiered on the singer's official YouTube channel. On 14 November, Minut Srca Mog was made available on both YouTube and other streaming platforms. That same day, the singer held its promotion at the Esplanade Zagreb Hotel, accompanied by close relatives, collaborators and friends where she performed some of the album's songs. On 20 November 2022, she appeared at the final evening of the Croatian talent show Zvijezde pjevaju where she performed "Samo se ljubit' isplati" live. On 25 January 2023, Rozga appeared together with Matić at the 2023 MAC Music Awards where they performed "Ti i Ja" live together.

Personal life and activism 
Little is known about Rozga's private life and her love relationships. She has frequently reported during interviews that she prefers to keep her private life secret and focus more on her music during interviews. Rozga's most public relationship was with Stjepan Hauser, the cellist of the Croatian band 2Cellos. They met in 2015 and got engaged the following year. In 2017, the relationship reportedly ended after two years. Since 2006, Rozga was diagnosed with hyperthyroidism which caused her skin problems, excessive fatigue and weight loss. Rozga receives hormone therapy on a daily basis for her condition. In 2018, Rozga was diagnosed with tachycardia for which she receives therapy with beta blockers. In 2020, Rozga reported a stalker to the police, suing him for following her from August 2019 until September 2020. Rozga has repeatedly revealed during interviews that she never drinks alcohol and protects her skin by not exposing it to sun.

During an interview for T-portal in January 2017, amidst anti-abortion discussions in Croatia, Rozga supported women's rights to abort, declaring it a personal choice. During the same interview, she also voiced her support for gender equality and the LGBTQ community. In 2013, Rozga took part in Goran Bregović's concert in Sarajevo titled Saso Mange at which funds were raised for musical education of members of the Roma minority. In April 2017, she participated in a roundtable event in Zagreb titled Gelem, Gelem - World4Them during which the results of the project aimed at integrating the Roma minority in the educational system and protecting their human rights. On 21 March 2016, as part of a concert dedicated to World Down Syndrome Day, she participated at the concert held in Zagreb.

During her career, Rozga collaborated with several Croatian and international fashion and cosmetic brands. From 2015, she became an ambassador for the French cosmetic brand Garnier in 9 countries in Eastern Europe. That same year, together with Bosnian football player Emir Spahić, she collaborated with credit deal of Sberbanke BH. She has also served as an advertiser for the Italian fashion brand Liu Jo the Croatian fashion brand ELFS and the car brand SEAT Hrvatska. In 2020, Rozga also collaborated with Max Factor in Croatia, Slovenia and Bosnia and Herzegovina.

Artistry and legacy
Rozga's music is generally classified as pop. Her earlier music records were heavily influenced by and contained Mediterranean and traditional music elements. Her music projects from the 2010s onwards incorporate more traditional regional musical styles, such as folk and turbo-folk elements which can be further classified in a genre dubbed "Croatian neofolk". While her first two studio albums, Oprosti Mala and Bižuterija were more consistent genre-wise, Rozga's third studio album, Moderna žena, experimented with several musical genres, including mainstream music, electronic dance music (EDM), Dalmatian traditional music, pop balladry and rap. Rozga cited Magazin singer Ljiljana Nikolovska as her biggest musical inspiration and the main reason she decided to venture in the music industry. Rozga was credited for bringing back the popularity to the group Magazin to a level similar to the period when Nikolovska was the lead singer of the band. After Rozga's joining of the group, the number of sold-out arena concerts also increased. Since the launch of her solo career, Rozga is accompanied by an all-male band during live performances. 

The lyrics of Rozga's song, which are frequently written by Vjekoslava Huljić, revolve around female experiences with love, betrayal, independence, heartbreak and female empowerement. The lyrics of her most famous song "Bižuterija", describe the experience of a dissatisfied woman who is left by her partner after having been treated as "bijouterie". The lyrics "žena, majka, kraljica" ("a woman, a mother, a queen") from the song "Bižuterija" became a catchphrase among the public on the Balkans, used to describe a powerful woman who can easily solve life problems. It also gained widespread use as a phrase of support and empowerment among women and as such, was used in merchandise.

In addition to her musical legacy, she has become renowned for her fashion style recognizable by mini-skirts and high platform heels which were coined "Rozgice". The singer describes her private fashion style as very different from her performance outfits as it consists primarily of jeans and shoes. Critics often compliment the singer's fashion styles, which they view as fitting with her slim figure that she managed to maintain throughout the years. She is also seen as a symbol of elegance and positive and lively energy. Rozga's music and live performances have inspired singer Lorena Bućan, who has also named her her most favorite singer in Croatia.

Awards and nominations 
During her solo career, Rozga has received numerous awards for both her songs and albums. In 2011, she received a Porin award in the category Hit of the Year for her song "Bižuterija". Until the early 2020s, she has received the Grand Prix award at the Split Festival five times.

Discography

Studio albums

with Magazin
Nebo boje moje ljubavi (1996)
Da si ti ja (1998)
Minus i plus (2000)
S druge strane Mjeseca (2002)
Paaa..? (2004)

Solo
 Oprosti Mala (2006)
 Bižuterija (2011)
 Moderna Žena (2016)

Compilation albums
 Best of Jelena Rozga (2011)
 Jelena Rozga (2017)
 Minut Srca Mog (2022)

Filmography

Tours
Headlining
The Bižuterija Tour (2010–12)
Minut Srca Mog Tour (2022–23)

Co-headlining
Karlovačko live 2011. (with Bajaga i Instruktori)

See also

Music of Croatia
Popular music in Croatia
Popular music in Yugoslavia

References

External links
 
 
 
 Jelena Rozga - official YouTube channel

1977 births
Living people
21st-century Croatian women singers
Musicians from Split, Croatia
Croatian folk-pop singers
20th-century Croatian women singers
Croatian LGBT rights activists